Stanleya pinnata is a species of flowering plant in the family Brassicaceae known as desert princesplume. It is a perennial herb or shrub native to North America.

Distribution
The plant is native to the western Great Plains and western North America.

It occurs in many types of open habitat, including deserts, chaparral, foothills, rocky cliffs, sagebrush, and prairie. It prefers alkali- and gypsum-rich soils.

Description
The stems are unbranched, hairless, often waxy in texture, and have woody bases. The leaves have fleshy blades up to 15 centimeters long by 5 wide which are divided into several long, narrow lobes. The blades are borne on petioles.

The top of the stem is occupied by a long inflorescence which is a dense raceme of many flowers. Each flower has four narrow yellowish sepals which open to reveal four bright yellow petals each up to 2 cm long. The stamens protruding from the flower's center may approach 3 cm in length.

The fruit is a curving, wormlike silique up to 8 cm long.

Uses
It has been used as a Native American traditional medicinal plant and food source, including by the Hopi, Zuni, Paiute, Navajo, Kawaiisu, and Tewa peoples.

Ecology
It is a larval host to both Becker's white and checkered white caterpillars.

Some of the plant's amino acids use selenium from the soil in place of sulfur, making it highly toxic to animals.

References

External links
Jepson Manual eFlora (TJM2) treatment of Stanleya pinnata var. pinnata
UC CalPhotos gallery

Brassicaceae
Flora of the Southwestern United States
Flora of the South-Central United States
Flora of the Great Plains (North America)
Flora of the United States
Flora of California
Flora of the Great Basin
Natural history of the California chaparral and woodlands
Natural history of the Mojave Desert
Plants used in Native American cuisine
Plants used in traditional Native American medicine
Flora without expected TNC conservation status